Oakland is the name of some locations in the U.S. state of Pennsylvania:

 Oakland (Pittsburgh), a neighborhood in Pittsburgh, Pennsylvania
 Oakland, Cambria County, Pennsylvania
 Oakland, Lawrence County, Pennsylvania
 Oakland, Susquehanna County, Pennsylvania
 Former name of Distant, Pennsylvania

See also 

 Oakland Township, Pennsylvania (disambiguation)